Scott Monk (born 14 June 1974) is an Australian author. Monk was born in Macksville in New South Wales. He later lived in North Ryde, attending local public school Peter Board High,  before moving to South Australia to join The Advertiser as a cadet journalist.  In 1999 he won South Australia's Young Journalist of the Year Award.

Monk has written many novels including:
Raw
The Crush
Boyz 'R' Us
The Never Boys
Beyond the Knock-Knock Door

Monk is a Christian who has spoken publicly about how his faith influences his writing.

Notes

External links
Short biography of Monk - Retrieved on 2008-04-06
Interview at Centre for Public Christianity

1974 births
Living people
20th-century Australian novelists
21st-century Australian novelists
Australian male novelists
Australian journalists
20th-century Australian male writers
21st-century Australian male writers